Bhimadole bus station is a bus station located in Bhimadole town of the Indian state of Andhra Pradesh. It is owned by Andhra Pradesh State Road Transport Corporation. It operates buses to all parts of the District and to nearby cities.

References

Bus stations in Andhra Pradesh
Buildings and structures in West Godavari district
Transport in West Godavari district